The Bladen Journal is a bi-weekly newspaper, published in Elizabethtown, North Carolina, United States. The paper caters to residents of Bladen County. The paper is published each Tuesday and Friday.

History 
In 1898 a daily news bulletin titled The Bladen Express began being published in Clarkton, North Carolina. In 1911 the paper changed its name to The Bladen Journal. About 16 years later the publication relocated to Elizabethtown, North Carolina.

In 1929 Jessie Lee Sugg McCulloch became editor of The Bladen Journal, thus becoming one of the first women in North Carolina to edit a newspaper. She served in the role until 1974. Alan Wooten was named editor in July 2018, and Sara Fox took over in September 2022.

The paper has won some awards from the North Carolina Press Association, including first place in sports coverage (W. Curt Vincent, reporting) and religion & faith reporting (Chrysta Carroll) in 2016 in the "Community newspapers under 3,500 circulation" category.

The Journal first began publishing in 1898 as The Clarkton Express.  and was given its current name in 1902. The Journal has had multiple owners including Community Newspaper Holdings, Heartland Publications, and Civitas Media. Civitas Media sold its properties in the Carolinas to Champion Media in 2017.

See also
 List of newspapers in North Carolina

References

External links
 BladenJournal.com
 Bladen Journal, Google news archive. —PDFs of 2,696 issues, dating from 1929 to 1985.

Newspapers published in North Carolina
Bladen County, North Carolina
Newspapers established in 1909
1909 establishments in North Carolina